List of types of equilibrium, the condition of a system in which all competing influences are balanced, in a wide variety of contexts.

Equilibrium may also refer to:

Film and television 
 Equilibrium (film), a 2002 science fiction film
 The Story of Three Loves, also known as Equilibrium, a 1953 romantic anthology film
 "Equilibrium" (seaQuest 2032)
 Equilibrium, short film by Steven Soderbergh, a segment of Eros
 "Equilibrium" (Star Trek: Deep Space Nine), Star Trek DS9 Episode 4, Season 3

Music
 Equilibrium (band), a folk metal band from Germany
 Equilibrium (Crowbar album), 2000
 Equilibrium (Erik Mongrain album), 2008
 Equilibrium (God Forbid album), 2012
 Equilibrium (Whitecross album), 1995
 Equilibrium (Matthew Shipp album), 2003
 IX Equilibrium, a 1999 album by Emperor
 Equilibrium, an album by Fergie Frederiksen

Other 
 Equilibrium (mechanics)

See also 
 Balance (disambiguation)